The discography of Kimbra, a New Zealand indie pop singer, consists of four studio albums and sixteen solo singles, as well as fifteen music videos. Her biggest international hit to date is her collaboration with Gotye, "Somebody That I Used to Know", which reached #1 in several countries, including the United States, the United Kingdom and Australia, as well as in Kimbra's native New Zealand.

Albums

Studio albums

Remix albums

Extended plays

Singles

As lead artist

As featured artist

Other charted songs

Songwriting Credits

Music videos

Notes

References

Discography
Discographies of New Zealand artists
Pop music discographies